Amblyseius valpoensis is a species of mite in the family Phytoseiidae.

References

valpoensis
Articles created by Qbugbot
Animals described in 1962